Crackle or crackling may refer to:

Foods 
 Cracklings, the tissue remaining after lard and tallow have been extracted from animal fats
 Pork rinds in American English, pork scratchings in British English when served in small pieces as a snack or side-dish, or pork crackling in the UK when the rind is left on a roasted pork joint
 Crackling bread, an American dish incorporating cracklings
 Gribenes, goose or chicken cracklings in Ashkenazi Jewish cuisine

Sounds 
 Crackles, an abnormal lung sound heard in a person with respiratory disease
 Crackling, a form of audible noise often associated with impulse noise
 Crackling noise, a broad type of noise

Other uses 
 Crackle (album),  album by Bauhaus
 Crackle (Kellogg's), a cartoon figure
 Crackle (physics), fifth derivative of displacement
 Cracklin', a 1963 album by Roy Haynes with Booker Ervin
 Crackle glaze, in pottery, a surface covered by small cracks, usually deliberate
 Craquelure or crackle, a finish on paintings, usually developed over time
 Crackle (service), formerly Grouper, then Crackle, then Sony Crackle, online distributor of streaming films and television shows

See also 
 
 Cackle (disambiguation)
 Creak (disambiguation)